The Australian Derby is an Australian Turf Club Group 1 Thoroughbred horse race for three-year-olds at set weights held at Randwick Racecourse, Sydney, Australia in April, during the Autumn ATC Championships Carnival. The race is considered to be the top ranked event for three-year-olds in Australian and New Zealand race classifications.

History

Name

Inaugurated in 1861 as the AJC Randwick Derby Stakes, the first race was won by Kyogle, a grandson of the Touchstone who was a four-time Champion sire in Great Britain & Ireland. In 1865 the name of the race was changed to the AJC Australia Derby Stakes then from 1873 through 1993 it was called the AJC Derby. Although the race officially became the AJC Australian Derby in 1994, it is still commonly referred to as the AJC Derby.

The official records show that Prince Humphrey won the 1928 Derby, but he wasn't in the race. It was a horse called Cragsman, by the same sire but with a different dam. This substitution came to light when Dick Tate of Toowoomba saw a picture of the Derby winner and was aware that Prince Humphrey had different markings, and had photographs to prove it.

From 1932 to 1956, geldings were banned from competing in the Derby.

Distance
Originally run at a distance of  miles, in 1972 the race was changed to 2,400 metres (~11.93 furlongs) to conform to the metric system. In 1978 there was no race held and under a reorganisation, it was changed from a spring racing event to be run in the autumn beginning in 1979.
Contested over 2,400 metres on a right-handed turf course, it has been won by some of the greats of the Australian turf, including Phar Lap, Tulloch, and Kingston Town.

Records

Time record: (at current 2,400 metres distance)

 2:28.41 - Octagonal (1996)

Largest winning margin:
 10 lengths - Trident (1886)

Most wins by a jockey:
 6 - Thomas Hales (1875, 1880, 1882, 1884, 1886, 1887)

1934 & 1948 racebooks

Gallery of noted winners

Winners

 2022 - Hitotsu
 2021 - Explosive Jack
 2020 - Quick Thinker
 2019 - Angel Of Truth
 2018 - Levendi
 2017 - Jon Snow
 2016 - Tavago
 2015 - Mongolian Khan
 2014 - Criterion
 2013 - It's A Dundeel
 2012 - Ethiopia
 2011 - Shamrocker
 2010 - Shoot Out
 2009 - Roman Emperor
 2008 - Nom Du Jeu
 2007 - Fiumicino
 2006 - Headturner
 2005 - Eremein
 2004 - Starcraft
 2003 - Clangalang
 2002 - Don Eduardo
 2001 - Universal Prince
 2000 - Fairway
 1999 - Sky Heights
 1998 - Gold Guru
 1997 - Ebony Grosve
 1996 - Octagonal
 1995 - Ivory's Irish
 1994 - Mahogany
 1993 - Innocent King
 1992 - Naturalism
 1991 - Durbridge
 1990 - Dr. Grace
 1989 - Research
 1988 - Beau Zam
 1987 - Myocard
 1986 - Bonecrusher
 1985 - Tristarc
 1984 - Prolific
 1983 - Strawberry Road
 1982 - Rose Of Kingston
 1981 - Our Paddy Boy
 1980 - Kingston Town
 1979 - Dulcify 
1978 - Race not held
1977 - Belmura Lad
1976 - Great Lover
1975 - Battle Sign
1974 - Taras Bulba
1973 - Imagele
1972 - Gold Brick
1971 - Classic Mission
1970 - Silver Sharpe
1969 - Divide And Rule
1968 - Wilton Park
1967 - Swift Peter
1966 - El Gordo
1965 - Prince Grant
1964 - Royal Sovereign
1963 - Summer Fiesta
1962 - Summer Prince
1961 - Summer Fair
1960 - Persian Lyric
1959 - Martello Towers
1958 - Skyline
1957 - Tulloch
1956 - Monte Carlo
1955 - Caranna
1954 - Prince Delville
1953 - Prince Morvi
1952 - Deep River
1951 - Channel Rise
1950 - Alister
1949 - Playboy
1948 - Carbon Copy
1947 - Valiant Crown
1946 - Concerto
1945 - Magnificent
1944 - Tea Rose
1943 - Moorland
1942 - Main Topic
1941 - Laureate
1940 - Pandect
1939 - Reading
1938 - Nuffield
1937 - Avenger
1936 - Talking
1935 - Allunga / Homer
1934 - Theo
1933 - Hall Mark 
1932 - Peter Pan
1931 - Ammon Ra
1930 - Tregilla
1929 - Phar Lap
1928 - Prince Humphrey
1927 - Trivalve
1926 - Rampion
1925 - Manfred
1924 - Heroic
1923 - Ballymena
1922 - Rivoli
1921 - Cupidon
1920 - Salitros
1919 - Artilleryman / Richmond Main 
1918 - Gloaming
1917 - Biplane
1916 - Kilboy
1915 - Cetigne
1914 - Mountain Knight
1913 - Beragoon
1912 - Cider
1911 - Cisco
1910 - Tanami
1909 - Prince Foote
1908 - Parsee
1907 - Mountain King
1906 - Poseidon
1905 - Noctuiform
1904 - Sylvanite
1903 - Belah
1902 - Abundance
1901 - Hautvilliers
1900 - Malster
1899 - Cranberry
1898 - Picture
1897 - Amberite
1896 - Charge
1895 - Bob Ray
1894 - Bonnie Scotland
1893 - Trenchant
1892 - Camoola
1891 - Stromboli
1890 - Gibraltar
1889 - Singapore
1888 - Melos
1887 - Abercorn
1886 - Trident
1885 - Nordenfeldt
1884 - Bargo
1883 - Le Grand
1882 - Navigator
1881 - Wheatear
1880 - Grand Flaneur
1879 - Nellie
1878 - His Lordship
1877 - Woodlands
1876 - Robinson Crusoe
1875 - Richmond
1874 - Kingsborough
1873 - Benvolio
1872 - Loup Garou
1871 - Javelin
1870 - Florence
1869 - Charon
1868 - The Duke
1867 - Fireworks
1866 - The Barb
1865 - Clove
1864 - Yattendon
1863 - Ramornie
1862 - Regno
1861 - Kyogle

Notes:

  Date of race rescheduled due to postponement of the Easter Saturday meeting because of the heavy track conditions. The meeting was moved to Easter Monday, 6 April 2015.
  Change in scheduling of race from spring to autumn
  Dead heat

See also
 Australian Triple Crown of Thoroughbred Racing
 List of Australian Group races
 Group races

The premier race for three-year-old Thoroughbreds in other countries:
 New Zealand Derby 
 Derby Italiano 
 Deutsches Derby 
 Epsom Derby 
 Kentucky Derby 
 Prix du Jockey Club 
 Tōkyō Yūshun 
 Queen's Plate

External links 
First three placegetters Australian Derby (ATC)

References

Group 1 stakes races in Australia
Flat horse races for three-year-olds
Randwick Racecourse
Sports competitions in Sydney
Recurring sporting events established in 1861
1861 establishments in Australia